10 Ursae Majoris is a binary star system in the northern constellation of Lynx. It is visible to the naked eye as a faint star with a combined apparent visual magnitude of 3.960. It is the third-brightest object in Lynx. Originally in the neighbouring constellation Ursa Major, it became part of Lynx with the official laying down of the constellation borders. The system is moving further from the Earth with a heliocentric radial velocity of 26.4 km/s. It is a probable member of the Hyades supercluster.

This is a spectroscopic binary—orbital motion from the two stars can be detected by Doppler shifts in their spectra. In this case, the two stars can also be split by differential astrometry. The primary is an F-type main-sequence star radiating 4.3 times the Sun's luminosity, and the magnitude 6.48 secondary is K-type with 0.6 times the luminosity of the Sun. The two orbit each other every  with an eccentricity of 0.15.

References

External links

F-type main-sequence stars
K-type main-sequence stars
Spectroscopic binaries
Hyades Stream
Lynx (constellation)
Durchmusterung objects
Ursae Majoris, 10
0332
076943
044248
3579